Columbia Heights is a mountain in Umatilla County in the U.S. state of Oregon, near the city of Milton-Freewater.

References 

Mountains of Oregon
Landforms of Umatilla County, Oregon